Demirciler is a village in the Kilis District, Kilis Province, Turkey. The village had a population of 74 in 2022.

The village was inhabited by Alevi Kurds in late 19th century.

References

Villages in Kilis District
Kurdish settlements in Kilis Province